Addiscombe tram stop is a light rail stop in the London Borough of Croydon in the southern suburbs of London.

The tram stop is located between Bingham Road and Lower Addiscombe Road, on a section of line which follows the trackbed of the former Woodside and South Croydon Railway. However the former railway was on an embankment at this point and crossed over both roads on bridges. During construction of Tramlink, the embankment was removed, the bridges replaced with level crossings and the tram stop built at street level.

The tram stop is built on the site of Bingham Road Halt on the Woodside and South Croydon Railway which was closed in 1915. A new station Bingham Road opened in 1935 was situated on the other (south) side of Bingham Road but closed in 1983.  The same railway's Addiscombe station was located on a branch line, about 500 metres to the west.

Services
Addiscombe is served by tram services operated by Tramlink.

On Saturday evenings and Sundays, the service is reduced to a tram every 7-8 minutes in each direction, with trams every 15 minutes to Elmers End and Beckenham Junction.

Services are operated using Bombardier CR4000 and Stadler Variobahn Trams.

Connections 
The stop is served by London Buses routes 289, 312 and 367 which provide connections to Elmers End, Beckenham, Bromley, Croydon Town Centre and Purley.

Free interchange for journeys made within an hour is available between bus services and between buses and trams is available at Addiscombe as part of Transport for London's Hopper Fare.

References

External links 

Addiscombe tram Stop – Timetables and live departures at Transport for London
Woodside & South Croydon railway
Bingham Road Station pages at Subterranea Britannica

Tramlink stops in the London Borough of Croydon
Railway stations in Great Britain opened in 2000